Govi (Santoo Govi) (born February 27, 1949) is a new age/ambient Hawaiian-German musician. Each of Govi's albums has reached the Top 10 on Billboard's New Age chart.

Biography 
Govi was born Werner Monka in Germany. During his teens, he lived in Minden/Westfalen (Germany), near Bielefeld. There he performed as the lead guitarist in bands like Blackbird (1962), Virus (1971), and Weed (1971, with Ken Hensley of Uriah Heep) that played everything from rock to blues. These experiences led to his first professional gig as a member of a group that played original material and won a national band competition and a recording contract that allowed them to tour throughout Germany.

Although a native of Germany, Werner Monka decided to make a radical change and leave Europe. He sold his electric guitar, a Gibson Les Paul, to pay for the flight to India. There he changed his name first to Govinda, then to Govi. He spent eight years living in India. He started playing the mandolin, mandocello, sitar, bouzouki, charango and the 8-string ukulele. While in India, he established a friendship with the German new age artists Deuter and Karunesh. Deuter co-produced Govi's first album Sky High, throughout which Deuter can be heard playing flutes and keyboards.

A prolific artist, Govi has released 19 albums to date. His fifth album, Guitar Odyssey, became one of the most successful albums in its genre, reaching the top ten of the Billboard new age albums, eventually climbing to number three. In 2022, Govi released a new EP featuring four new songs in his signature style.

Govi currently lives in Kula, Hawaii. He often collaborates with a fellow German musician, Karunesh, who also lives in Hawaii.

Discography

Studio albums

 1988 - Sky High
 1991 - Heart of a Gypsy
 1993 - Cuchama
 1995 - Passion & Grace
 1997 - Guitar Odyssey
 1999 - No Strings Attached: Govi at his Exuberant Best
 1999 - Andalusian Nights
 2000 - Seventh Heaven
 2001 - Your Lingering Touch: Govi at his Romantic Best
 2002 - Mosaico
 2004 - Saffron & Silk
 2005 - Havana Sunset: The Best of Govi
 2007 - Jewel Box
 2008 - Touch of Light
 2011 - Guitarra Mistica
 2013 - Pure at Heart
 2015 - The High Road
 2018 - Luminosity
 2022  - Four 4 U (EP)

Other compilations
 1997 - Tranquility (A Real Music Sampler)  
 1997 - Rhythm: A Real Music Sampler 
 1998 - Eternity II: The Encore-(A Romantic Collection) 
 2001 - Letting the World Go By 
 2002 - Moonlight Fantasy 
 2004 - Confort Music 1 
 2006 - InSPAration 
 2006 - iRelax During a Busy Day 
 2006 - iRelax Leaving the Workday Behind 
 2007 - iRelax for Lovers 
 2007 - iRelax in Traffic 
 2012 - Reverie
 2017 - Relaxation Collection 2 - Cool Breeze, Gentle Rhythms

Other compilation appearances
 1997 - Gypsy Passion: New Flamenco (Narada)
 1999 - Obsession: New Flamenco Romance (Narada)
 2000 - Gypsy Fire (Narada)
 2000 - Guitar Greats: The Best of New Flamenco - Volume I (Baja/TSR Records)
 2004 - Barcelona: Music Celebrating the Flavors of the World (Williams Sonoma)
 2009 - Gypsy Spice: Best Of New Flamenco (Baja/TSR Records)
 2011 - The World Of The Spanish Guitar Vol. 1 (Higher Octave Music)
 2013 - Guitar Greats: The Best of New Flamenco - Volume III (Baja/TSR Records)

See also
 New Flamenco
 Flamenco rumba
 New-age music

References

External links 

 Govi | Official website
 Govi's videos on YouTube
 Govi on Last.fm
 
 Govi on Amazon
 Govi on Real Music
 Govi

1949 births
Living people
German male musicians
New-age guitarists
German guitarists
German male guitarists